Neville Gomez Hodge (born 8 December 1955) is a former United States Virgin Islands sprinter who competed in the men's 100m competition at the 1992 Summer Olympics. He recorded a 10.71, not enough to qualify for the next round past the heats. His personal best is 10.32, set in 1993. He also ran that Olympiad for the USVI 4x100m team, which recorded a 40.48, good for 5th place. Previously, in the 1988 Summer Olympics, he ran a 10.73 in the 100m contest. In the 1984 Summer Olympics, he ran 21.12 in the 200m, enough to qualify for the next round, where he did not start (DNS). He also ran in the 100m contest in 1984, scoring a 10.58, enough to qualify for round 2, where a 10.69 was not enough to advance further. He won a bronze medal in the 4 x 100 metres relay at the 1991 Pan American Games.

References

1955 births
Living people
United States Virgin Islands male sprinters
Athletes (track and field) at the 1984 Summer Olympics
Athletes (track and field) at the 1988 Summer Olympics
Athletes (track and field) at the 1992 Summer Olympics
Olympic track and field athletes of the United States Virgin Islands
Athletes (track and field) at the 1983 Pan American Games
Athletes (track and field) at the 1987 Pan American Games
Athletes (track and field) at the 1991 Pan American Games
Pan American Games medalists in athletics (track and field)
Pan American Games bronze medalists for the United States Virgin Islands
World Athletics Championships athletes for the United States Virgin Islands
Medalists at the 1991 Pan American Games